Arthroplea is a genus of flatheaded mayflies in the family Arthropleidae. There are at least two described species in Arthroplea.

Species
These two species belong to the genus Arthroplea:
 Arthroplea bipunctata (McDunnough, 1924)
 Arthroplea congener Bengtsson, 1908

References

Further reading

 
 

Mayflies
Articles created by Qbugbot